This is a list of Swedish kings, queens, regents and viceroys of the Kalmar Union.

History

The earliest record of what is generally considered to be a Swedish king appears in Tacitus' work Germania, c. 100 AD (the king of the Suiones). However, due to scant and unreliable sources before the 11th century, lists of succession traditionally start in the 10th century with king Olof Skötkonung, and his father Eric the Victorious, who also were the first Swedish kings to be baptized. There are, however, lists of Swedish pagan monarchs with far older dates, but in many cases these kings appear in sources of disputed historical reliability. These records notably deal with the legendary House of Yngling, and based on the Danish chronicler Saxo Grammaticus, Eric the Victorious and Olof Skötkonung have often been classified as belonging to the Swedish house of Ynglings, tracing them back to Sigurd Hring and Ragnar Lodbrok (whom Saxo considered to belong to the House of Yngling). However, according to Icelandic sources this line of kings was broken (see Ingjald and Ivar Vidfamne). As there is no evidence that Eric and Olof ever used the Yngling name themselves, modern historians instead refer to their family as the House of Munsö, the Old Dynasty or the House of Uppsala.

In the 16th century, Johannes Magnus constructed a mythical line of Swedish kings, beginning with Magog, the son of Japheth, to demonstrate the antiquity of the Swedish throne. On the basis of that list, Eric XIV and Charles IX chose to use high ordinals; previous monarchs with those names are traditionally numbered counting backward from Eric XIV and Charles IX. In contemporary Swedish usage, medieval kings are usually not given any ordinal at all.

A list of Swedish monarchs, represented on the map of the Estates of the Swedish Crown, created by French engraver Jacques Chiquet (1673–1721) and published in Paris in 1719, starts with Canute I and shows Eric XIV and Charles IX as Eric IV and Charles II respectively, while the only Charles who holds his traditional ordinal in the list is Charles XII, being the highest enumerated.

Sweden has been ruled by queens regnant on three occasions: by Margaret (1389–1412), Christina (1632–1654) and Ulrika Eleonora (1718–1720) respectively, and earlier, briefly, by a female regent Duchess Ingeborg (1318–1319).

In addition to the list below, the Swedish throne was also claimed by the kings of the Polish–Lithuanian Commonwealth from 1599 to 1660. Following his abdication Sigismund continued to claim the throne from 1599 to his death in 1632. After his death the claim was continued by his sons, Vladislaus IV (from 1632 to 1648) and John II Casimir (from 1648 to 1660).

The Swedish monarchs have been of the House of Bernadotte since 1818, based on the Swedish Act of Succession of 1810. The Constitution of 1809 assumed that the monarch would appoint his Cabinet as he saw fit, but growing calls for democratisation during the end of the 19th century made such an idea impossible to sustain. 1917 marks the end of any real political power for the Swedish monarch. The Constitution of 1974 codifies this development by removing all decision-making powers from the monarch, making it both de facto and de jure a ceremonial position, and today the Government has the chief executive power, not the king.

In 1980, the rule of succession was changed from agnatic to absolute primogeniture, to the benefit of Princess Victoria (born 1977), the current heir apparent.

Monarchs and regents of Sweden

House of Munsö 

|width=auto|Eric the Victorious (Erik Segersäll)   970 –  995||Coin (disputed)||||||Died of illness in Old Uppsala  995, aged about 50
|-
|width=auto|Olof Skötkonung   995 –  1022|||| 980, son of Eric the Victorious||Estrid of the Obotrites|| 1022, aged about 42
|-
|width=auto|Anund Jacob (Anund Jakob)   1022–1050 
||||25 July 1008 or 1010 son of Olof Skötkonung and Estrid of the Obotrites||Gunnilda (?) || 1050, aged about 40
|-
|width=auto|Emund the Old (Emund den gamle)  1050–1060|| ||Illegitimate son of Olof Skötkonung||Astrid (?) || 1060
|-
|}

House of Stenkil and contemporary 
 House of Stenkil

|bgcolor=#00ffaa|Stenkil (Stenkil Ragnvaldsson)  1060–1066|| ||Probably from Västergötland, son of Ragnvald Ulfsson (according to Hervarar saga)||"Ingamoder"House of Munsö||Died of illness in "Svitjod", 1066
|-
|Eric and Eric  1066–1067|| || || ||1067, died in battle against each other for the throne
|-
|bgcolor=#00ffaa|Halsten Stenkilsson (Halsten)  1067–1070|| || 1050 son of Stenkil|| ||1084, aged about 34
|-
|Anund Gårdske  1070–1075|| ||Came from Garðaríki, (Kievan Rus'), probably with ancestral links to Scandinavia|| ||
|-
|bgcolor=#00ffaa|Håkan the Red (Håkan Röde)  ||||Levene, Västergötland,  1040, son of Stenkil|| ||
|-
|bgcolor=#00ffaa|Inge the Elder (Inge den äldre)  1079–1084, 1087–1105||Non-contemporary||Son of Stenkil and "Ingamoder"||Helena, sister of Blot-Sweyn||Died of illness, 1105. First buried in Hånger, but then moved to Varnhem Abbey 
|-
| Blot-Sweyn (Blot-Sven)  || || || ||1087, ambushed by Inge the Elder's troops
|-
| align=left colspan=5 bgcolor=#00ffaa|1087–1105, Inge the Elder (Inge den äldre) (second period)
|-
|bgcolor=#00ffaa|Philip (Filip Halstensson) 1105–1118||Non-contemporary||Son of King Halsten||Ingegerddaughter of Harald III of NorwayHouse of Hardrada||Assumed to be buried in Vreta Abbey with his brother Inge II
|-
|bgcolor=#00ffaa| Inge the Younger (Inge den yngre)  1110–1125||Non-contemporary||son of King Halsten||Ulvhild HåkansdotterHouse of Thjotta||Östergötland, 1125, rumored poisoned by his wife with an "evil drink". Assumed to be buried in Vreta Abbey with his brother Philip
|-
|Ragnvald Knaphövde  1125–1126||Coin (disputed)||Assumed to be related in some way to the House of Stenkil|| ||1126, killed by supporters of Magnus I of Sweden before being accepted in Västergötland 
|-
| align=left colspan=5|1126–30 Magnus I of Sweden of the House of Estrid ruled the West Goths, and soon-to-be King Sverker (below) ruled the East Goths.
|-
|}

Houses of Sverker and Eric 

 House of Estridsen House of Eric  House of Sverker House of Bjelbo (see below)

|bgcolor=#ccddff|Magnus I,  1126–1132||Non-contemporary||son of Niels, King of Denmark and Margaret Fredkulla (the daughter of Inge the Elder)||Richeza of Poland daughter of Bolesław III WrymouthHouse of Piast||Died in a civil war against Sverker I, in the battle of Fotevik, 4 Juny 1134
|-
|bgcolor=pink|Sverker I the Elder (also called Clubfoot, Sverker den äldre or Klumpfot; king from 1125 in Östergötland), 1130 – 25 December 1156||||of East Geatish ancestry, son of Cornube or Kol||(1) Ulvhild HåkansdotterHouse of Thjotta(2) Richeza of PolandHouse of Piast||Murdered by his own coachman on Christmas Day 1156 while going to church; some suspect Magnus II of being behind the murder. Buried at Alvastra Abbey
|-
|bgcolor=yellow|Eric (IX) the Saint (Erik den helige),  1156 – 18 May 1160|||| 1120, some appoint him to have West Geatish roots||bgcolor=#ccddff|Christina of Denmark ||Killed by Magnus II as he came out of the church in Uppsala, 18 May 1160, aged about 40, enshrined in Uppsala Cathedral
|-
|bgcolor=#ccddff|Magnus II,  1160–1161||Non-contemporary||son of Henry and Ingrid Ragvaldsdotter (the granddaughter of Inge the Elder)||Bridgetdaughter of Harald IV of NorwayHouse of Gille||Died in the battle of Örebro against Charles VII, 1161
|-
|bgcolor=pink|Charles VII (Karl Sverkersson),   1161 – 12 April 1167||||1130, son of Sverker I the Elder and Ulvhild Håkansdotter||1163 ChristinaHouse of Hvide||Killed by Canute I Ericson on Visingsö, 12 April 1167, aged about 37, buried at Alvastra Abbey
|-
|bgcolor=yellow|Canute I Ericson (Knut Eriksson) (1167–1173 not in Östergötland; from 1173 also in Östergötland), 1167–1195/1196||Non-contemporary||before 1150, son of Eric the Saint and Kristina (probably a granddaughter of Inge the Elder)||Cecilia Johansdotter||Died peacefully in 1195 or 1196, buried at Varnhem Abbey
|-
|bgcolor=pink rowspan="2"|Sverker II the Younger (Sverker den yngre), 1196 – 31 January 1208||rowspan="2"|Coin (disputed)||rowspan="2"|born before 1167, probably already  1164 son of king Charles VII and queen Christine Stigsdatter of Hvide||(1) BenedictaHouse of Hvide||rowspan="2"|Died in the Battle of Gestilren, 17 July 1210, aged about 45, buried at Alvastra Abbey
|-
|bgcolor=tan|(2) IngegerdHouse of Bjelbo
|-
|bgcolor=yellow|Eric (X) (Erik Knutsson),  31 January 1208 – 10 April 1216||||1180 son of Canute I Ericson||bgcolor=#ccddff|Richeza of Denmark (the daughter of Valdemar I of Denmark)||Died suddenly in fever on Näs Castle, Visingsö, 10 April 1216, aged about 36, buried at Varnhem Abbey
|-
|bgcolor=pink|John I the Child (Johan Sverkersson unge), Spring 1216 – 10 March 1222||||1201 son of Sverker II||None ||Died on Visingsö, 10 March 1222, aged about 21, buried at Alvastra Abbey
|-
|bgcolor=yellow|Eric (XI) the Lisp and Lame (Erik läspe och halte),  Summer 1222–28 or 29 November 1229||||1216 son of king Erik X of Sweden and Richeza of Denmark||bgcolor=tan|Catherine Sunesdotter||2 February 1250, aged about 34, buried at Varnhem Abbey
|-
|bgcolor=yellow|Canute II the Tall (Knut Långe)  28 or 29 November 1229 – 1234||||son of Holmger who was "nepos" (nephew?) of Canute I Ericson||HelenHouse of Strange||1234, buried at Sko kloster
|-
|bgcolor=yellow|Eric (XI) the Lisp and Lame (Erik läspe och halte),  1234 – 2 February 1250||||1216 son of king Erik X of Sweden and Richeza of Denmark||bgcolor=tan|Catherine Sunesdotter||2 February 1250, aged about 34, buried at Varnhem Abbey
|-
|}

House of Bjelbo 
 House of Bjelbo House of Estridsen House of Wittelsbach (see below)
The House of Bjelbo is sometimes referred to as the House of Folkung

|bgcolor=tan|Valdemar (Valdemar Birgersson)  Spring 1250 – 22 July 1275||||1239 son of Birger jarl and Ingeborg Eriksdotter (a daughter of Eric X)||bgcolor=#ccddff|Sophia of Denmarkdaughter of King Eric IV||Died while imprisoned by his brother Magnus at Nyköping Castle, 26 December 1302, aged about 63, buried at Vreta Abbey or Riddarholmen Church
|-
|bgcolor=tan|Magnus III (Magnus Ladulås)  22 July 1275 – 18 December 1290||||1240 son of Birger jarl and Princess Ingeborg Eriksdotter (a daughter of Eric X)||Helwig of HolsteinHouse of Schauenburg||Visingsö, 18 December 1290, aged about 50, buried in Riddarholmen Church
|-
|bgcolor=tan|Birger (Birger Magnusson)  18 December 1290 – March/April 1318|| || 1280 son of Magnus III and Helwig of Holstein||bgcolor=#ccddff|1298 Martha of Denmark||31 May 1321, in exile in Denmark, after murdering his brothers at Nyköping Banquet, aged about 41, buried at Ringsted, Zealand
|-
|rowspan="2"|Ingeborg Regent 1318 – 8 July 1319House of Sverre||rowspan="2"|||rowspan="2"| 1301 daughter of Haakon V of Norway||bgcolor=tan|(1) 1312 Eric of SwedenHouse of Bjelbo||rowspan="2"|17 June 1361 as Duchess of Halland, aged 59 or 60
|-
|(2, after her rule) 1327 Canute, Duke of HallandHouse of Porse
|-
|bgcolor=tan|Magnus IV Ericson (Magnus Eriksson)  8 July 1319 – 15 February 1364||Non-contemporary||Norway, 1316 son of Erik Magnusson (brother of Birger) and Ingeborg Håkonsdotter||1335 Blanche of NamurHouse of Dampierre||Drowned in a shipwreck when seeking refuge with his son in Bømlofjord, Norway, 1 December 1374, aged about 58
|-
|bgcolor=tan|Eric (XII) (Erik Magnusson)  17 October 1356 – 20 June 1359 (rival king until 1359; joint-rule with father months before death)|| ||1339 son of Magnus IV Eriksson and Blanche of Namur||bgcolor=palegreen|Beatrice of Bavaria||Generally believed that he and his wife died in the plague, 20 June 1359, aged about 20
|-
|bgcolor=tan|Hakon (Håkan Magnusson)  15 February 1362 – 15 February 1364 <small>(joint-rule with father)||||1340 son of Magnus IV Eriksson and Blanche of Namur||bgcolor=#ccddff| 9 April 1363 in CopenhagenMargaret Valdemarsdotter (see below)||Oslo, 11 September 1380, aged about 40, buried in Oslo
|}

House of Mecklenburg 

|-
|Albert (Albrekt av Mecklenburg)  15 February 1364 – 24 February 1389 ||||Mecklenburg,  1338, son of Albert II, Duke of Mecklenburg and Euphemia of Sweden||(1) Richardis of SchwerinHouse of Hagen(2, after his Swedish reign)Agnes of Brunswick-LüneburgHouse of Welf||Mecklenburg, 1 April 1412, aged about 74, buried in Doberan Abbey, Germany
|-
|}

Monarchs during the Kalmar Union period and Regents (Riksföreståndare) 
 House of Estridsen House of Wittelsbach  House of Oldenburg House of Bjelbo

|bgcolor=#ccddff|Margaret (Margareta Valdemarsdotter)  24 February 1389 – 28 October 1412||  ||Vordingborg Castle, 1353 daughter of Valdemar IV and Helvig of Sønderjylland||bgcolor=tan|Haakon VI of Norway(see above)||Flensburg Fjord, 28 October 1412, aged about 55, buried in Roskilde Cathedral
|-
|Eric (XIII) (Erik av Pommern)  23 July 1396 – 24 September 1439 (deposed 1434–1435 and 1436)House of Griffins ||||Rügenwalde, Pomerania, 1382, son of Wartislaw VII, Duke of Pomerania and Mary of Mecklenburg-Schwerin||(1) Philippa of EnglandHouse of Lancaster(2, after his Swedish reign)Cecilia||Rügenwalde Castle, 3 May 1459, aged about 77, buried in St. Mary's Church, Darłowo, Poland
|-
|align=left colspan=5|
 October 1438 – Autumn 1440 : Regent Karl Knutsson Bonde later King Charles VIII
|-
|bgcolor=PaleGreen|Christopher (Kristoffer av Bayern)Autumn 1441 – 6 January 1448||||Neumarkt in der Oberpfalz in Bavaria, February 26, 1418 son of Duke John of Pfalz-Neumarkt and Catherine Vratislava||Dorothea of BrandenburgHouse of Hohenzollern||Helsingborg, 5 January or 6 January 1448, aged 29, buried at Roskilde Cathedral
|-
|align=left colspan=5|
 January – 20 June 1448: Regents Bengt Jönsson (Oxenstierna) and Nils Jönsson (Oxenstierna)
|-
|Charles VIII (Karl Knutsson Bonde)  20 June 1448 – 24 February 1457, 9 August 1464 – 30 January 1465 and 12 November 1467 – 15 May 1470House of Bonde||||Ekholmen Castle, 1408 or 1409 son of Knut Tordsson (Bonde) and Margareta Karlsdotter (Sparre av Tofta)||(1, before his reign)Birgitta TuresdotterHouse of Bielke(2) Catherine of BjurumHouse of Gumsehuvud(3) Christina Abrahamsdotter||15 May 1470, aged about 61 or 62, buried at Riddarholmen Church
|-
|align=left colspan=5|
 March – 23 June 1457: Regents Jöns Bengtsson (Oxenstierna), archbishop of Upsala, and Erik Axelsson (Tott) 
|-
|bgcolor=orange|Christian I (Kristian I)  23 June 1457 – 23 June 1464||||Oldenburg, Lower Saxony, February 1426, son of Dietrich of Oldenburg and Helvig of Schauenburg||Dorothea of BrandenburgHouse of Hohenzollern||Copenhagen, 21 May 1481, aged 55, buried at Roskilde Cathedral
|-
|align=left colspan=5|9 August 1464 – 30 January 1465 Charles VIII (Karl Knutsson Bonde) (second period)
 26 December 1464 – 11 August 1465 : Regent Kettil Karlsson (Vasa), bishop of Linköping
 11 August 1465 – 18 October 1466 : Regent Jöns Bengtsson (Oxenstierna)
 18 October 1466 – 12 November 1467 : Regent Erik Axelsson (Tott)
|-
|align=left colspan=5|12 November 1467 – 15 May 1470 Charles VIII (Karl Knutsson Bonde) (third period)
 16 May 1470 – 6 October 1497 : Regent Sten Sture the Elder (Sten Sture den äldre) 
|-
|bgcolor=orange|John II ("Hans")  6 October 1497 – August 1501||||Aalborg Castle, 2 February 1455, son of Christian I and Dorothea of Brandenburg||Christina of SaxonyHouse of Wettin||Aalborg Castle, 20 February 1513, aged 58, buried in St. Canute's Cathedral, Odense
|-
|align=left colspan=5|
 12 November 1501 – 14 December 1503 : Regent Sten Sture the Elder
 21 January 1504 – 31 December 1511 or 2 January 1512 : Regent Svante Nilsson (Svante Nilsson, herre till Ekesjö)
 Middle of January – 23 July 1512 : Regent Erik Arvidsson Trolle
 23 July 1512 – 3 February 1520 : Regent Sten Sture the Younger (Sten Sture den yngre)
|-
|bgcolor=orange|Christian II (Kristian Tyrann, "Christian the Tyrant")  1 November 1520 – 23 August 1521||||Nyborg Castle, 1 July 1481 son of Hans and Christina of Saxony||Isabella of AustriaHouse of Habsburg||Kalundborg Castle, 25 January 1559, aged 77, buried in St. Canute's Cathedral, Odense
|-
|}

House of Vasa 
 House of Vasa House of Wittelsbach House of Oldenburg

|bgcolor=violet|Gustav I (Gustav Vasa)  6 June 1523 – 29 September 1560 also as regent Gustav Eriksson (Vasa), 1521–1523||||Rydboholm Castle or Lindholmen in Uppland, 12 May 1496 son of Erik Johansson and Cecilia Månsdotter||(1) Catherine of Saxe-LauenburgHouse of Ascania(2) MargaretHouse of Leijonhufvud(3) CatherineHouse of Stenbock||Tre Kronor (castle), 29 September 1560, aged 64, buried in Uppsala Cathedral
|-
|bgcolor=violet|Eric XIV (Erik XIV)  29 September 1560 – 29 September 1568||||Tre Kronor (castle), 13 December 1533 son of Gustav I and Catherine of Saxe-Lauenburg||Karin Månsdotter||Died (Poisoned) while imprisoned in Örbyhus Castle, 26 February 1577. Aged 43, buried at Västerås Cathedral
|-
|bgcolor=violet|John III (Johan III) 30 September 1568 – 17 November 1592||||Stegeborg Castle, Östergötland, 20 December 1537 son of Gustav I and Margaret Leijonhufvud||(1) Catherine of PolandHouse of Jagiello(2) GunillaHouse of Bielke||Tre Kronor (castle), 17 November 1592, aged 54, buried at Uppsala Cathedral
|-
|bgcolor=violet|Sigmund (Sigismund) 17 November 1592 – 24 July 1599||||Gripsholm Castle, 20 June 1566, son of John III and Catherine Jagellonica of Poland.||(1) Anne of AustriaHouse of Habsburg(2, after his Swedish reign)Constance of AustriaHouse of Habsburg||Warsaw, Poland, 30 April 1632, aged 65, buried at Wawel Cathedral, Kraków, Poland
|-
|bgcolor=violet rowspan="2"|Charles IX (Karl IX)  22 March 1604 – 30 October 1611  also as regent Duke Charles, 1599–1604||rowspan="2"|||rowspan="2"|Tre Kronor (castle), 4 October 1550 son of Gustav I and Margaret Leijonhufvud||bgcolor=PaleGreen|(1, before his reign)Maria of Palatinate-SimmernHouse of Wittelsbach||rowspan="2"|Nyköping Castle, 30 October 1611, aged 61, buried at Strängnäs Cathedral
|-
|bgcolor=orange|(2) Christina of Holstein-GottorpHouse of Oldenburg
|-
|bgcolor=violet|Gustavus Adolphus the Great (Gustav II Adolph, Gustav II Adolf, "Gustav Adolf den Store", Lion of the North)  30 October 1611 – 6 November 1632||||Tre Kronor (castle), 9 December 1594, son of Charles IX and Christina of Holstein-Gottorp.||Maria Eleonora of BrandenburgHouse of Hohenzollern||6 November 1632, in the Battle of Lützen, Electorate of Saxony, aged 37, buried in Riddarholmen Church
|-
|bgcolor=violet|Christina (Kristina) 6 November 1632 – 6 June 1654||||Stockholm, 8 December 1626, daughter of Gustavus Adolphus and Maria Eleonora of Brandenburg||None||Rome, 19 April 1689, aged 62, buried at St. Peter's Basilica, Vatican City
|-
|}

House of Palatinate-Zweibrücken, a branch of the House of Wittelsbach 
 House of Wittelsbach House of Oldenburg House of Hesse

|bgcolor=PaleGreen|Charles X Gustav (Karl X Gustav)  6 June 1654 – 13 February 1660||||Nyköping Castle, 8 November 1622, son of John Casimir, Count Palatine of Zweibrücken-Kleeburg and Catharina of Sweden (daughter of Charles IX)||bgcolor=orange|Hedwig Eleonora of Holstein-Gottorp||Gothenburg, 13 February 1660, aged 37, buried in Riddarholmen Church
|-
|bgcolor=PaleGreen|Charles XI (Karl XI)  13 February 1660 – 5 April 1697||||Tre Kronor (castle), 24 November 1655 son of Charles X and Hedwig Eleonora of Holstein-Gottorp||bgcolor=orange|Ulrika Eleonora of Denmark||Tre Kronor (castle), 5 April 1697, aged 41, buried in Riddarholmen Church
|-
|bgcolor=PaleGreen|Charles XII (Karl XII)  5 April 1697 – 30 November 1718||||Tre Kronor (castle), 17 June 1682 son of Charles XI and Ulrika Eleonora of Denmark||None||Fredrikshald, Norway, 30 November 1718, aged 36, buried in Riddarholmen Church
|-
|bgcolor=PaleGreen|Ulrica Eleanor (Ulrika Eleonora) 5 December 1718 – 29 February 1720||||Tre Kronor (castle), 23 January 1688 daughter of Charles XI and Ulrika Eleonora of Denmark||bgcolor=#ffdead|Landgrave Frederick VHouse of Hesse(see below)||Stockholm, 24 November 1741, aged 53, buried in Riddarholmen Church
|-
|}

House of Hesse 
 House of Hesse House of Wittelsbach

|bgcolor=#ffdead rowspan="2"|Frederick I of Sweden24 March 1720 – 25 March 1751|| rowspan="2"||| rowspan="2"|Kassel (in today's Germany), 23 April 1676, son of Charles I, Landgrave of Hesse-Kassel and Princess Maria Amalia of Courland||(1, before his reign)Louise Dorothea of PrussiaHouse of Hohenzollern|| rowspan="2"|Stockholm, 25 March 1751, aged 74, buried in Riddarholmen Church
|-
|bgcolor=PaleGreen|(2) Ulrika Eleonora of SwedenHouse of Wittelsbach
|-
|}

House of Holstein-Gottorp, a branch of the House of Oldenburg 

 House of Oldenburg 
|bgcolor=orange|Adolf Frederick (Adolf Fredrik) 25 March 1751 – 12 February 1771||||Gottorp, Schleswig (in today's Germany), 14 May 1710, son of Christian August of Holstein-Gottorp, Prince of Eutin and Albertina Frederica of Baden-Durlach||Louisa Ulrika of PrussiaHouse of Hohenzollern||Stockholm Palace, 12 February 1771, aged 60, buried in Riddarholmen Church
|-
|bgcolor=orange|Gustav III 12 February 1771 – 29 March 1792||||Stockholm,  son of King Adolf Frederick of Sweden and Louisa Ulrika of Prussia||bgcolor=orange|Sophia Magdalena of Denmark||Assassinated (shot in the back when he was at a masked ball at the opera, 16 March 1792). Died in Stockholm Palace, 29 March 1792, aged 46, buried in Riddarholmen Church
|-
|bgcolor=orange|Gustav IV Adolph 29 March 1792 – 10 May 1809 with Charles, Duke of Södermanland as regent 1792–1796||
||Stockholm Palace, 1 November 1778 son of Gustav III and Sophia Magdalena||Frederica of BadenHouse of Zähringen||St. Gallen, Switzerland, 7 February 1837, aged 58, buried in Riddarholmen Church
|-
|bgcolor=orange|Charles XIII (Karl XIII)  6 June 1809 – 5 February 1818||||Stockholm, 7 October 1748, son of Adolf Frederick of Sweden and Louisa Ulrika of Prussia||bgcolor=orange|Hedwig Elizabeth Charlotte of Holstein-Gottorp||Stockholm, 5 February 1818, aged 69, buried in Riddarholmen Church
|-
|}

House of Bernadotte 
 House of Bernadotte House of Hesse

|bgcolor=lightgray|Charles XIV John (Karl XIV Johan)  (born Jean Bernadotte) 5 February 1818 – 8 March 1844||||Pau, France, 26 January 1763 son of Jean Henri Bernadotte and Jeanne de Saint-Vincent||Désirée Clary||Stockholm Palace, 8 March 1844, aged 81, buried in Riddarholmen Church
|-
|bgcolor=lightgray|Oscar I  (born Joseph François Oscar Bernadotte) 8 March 1844 – 8 July 1859||||Paris, France, 4 July 1799, son of Charles XIV John and Désirée Clary||Josephine of LeuchtenbergHouse of Beauharnais||Stockholm Palace, 8 July 1859, aged 60, buried in Riddarholmen Church
|-
|bgcolor=lightgray|Charles XV (Karl XV)  (Carl Ludvig Eugen) 8 July 1859 – 18 September 1872||||Stockholm Palace, 3 May 1826 son of Oscar I and Josephine of Leuchtenberg||Louise of the NetherlandsHouse of Orange-Nassau||Malmö, 18 September 1872, aged 46, buried in Riddarholmen Church
|-
|bgcolor=lightgray|Oscar II  (Oscar Fredrik) 18 September 1872 – 8 December 1907||||Stockholm, 21 January 1829 son of Oscar I and Josephine of Leuchtenberg||Sofia of NassauHouse of Orange-Nassau||Stockholm, 8 December 1907, aged 78, buried in Riddarholmen Church
|-
|bgcolor=lightgray|Gustaf V  (Oscar Gustaf Adolf) 8 December 1907 – 29 October 1950||||Drottningholm Palace, 16 June 1858 son of Oscar II and Sofia of Nassau||Victoria of BadenHouse of Zähringen||Drottningholm Palace, 29 October 1950, aged 92, buried in Riddarholmen Church
|-
|bgcolor=lightgray rowspan="2"|Gustaf VI Adolf(Oscar Fredrik Wilhelm Olaf Gustaf Adolf)29 October 1950 – 15 September 1973||rowspan="2"|||rowspan="2"|Stockholm, 11 November 1882 son of Gustav V and Victoria of Baden||(1, before his reign)Margaret of ConnaughtHouse of Wettin (Windsor)||rowspan="2"|Helsingborg, 15 September 1973, aged 90, buried at Royal Burial Ground
|-
|bgcolor=#ffdead|(2) Louise House of Hesse (Battenberg/Mountbatten)
|-
|bgcolor=lightgray|Carl XVI Gustaf (Carl Gustaf Folke Hubertus) 15 September 1973 – present||||Haga Palace, 30 April 1946 son of Prince Gustaf Adolf, Duke of Västerbotten and Princess Sibylla of Saxe-Coburg and Gotha||Silvia Sommerlath||Living
|-
|}

Timeline of Swedish monarchs

See also 

Constitution of Sweden
Dominions of Sweden
Government of Sweden
Kings of Sweden family tree
Lands of Sweden
Line of succession to the Swedish Throne
List of Swedes
List of Swedish consorts
List of Swedish governments
List of Swedish military commanders
List of Swedish politicians
Politics of Sweden
Prime Minister of Sweden
Provinces of Sweden
Realm of Sweden
Riksdag, Riksdag of the Estates
Royal mottos of Swedish monarchs
Swedish royal family
List of Danish monarchs
List of Norwegian monarchs
List of Estonian rulers
List of Finnish rulers
List of Greenlandic rulers
List of rulers of Iceland
Pomeranian rulers
Lists of incumbents

Notes

References

Citations

Sources 

 The Cambridge History of Scandinavia. Vol.I. Cambridge University Press, 2003.
 Morby John E. Dynasties of the World. Oxford University Press, 2002.
 Liljegren, Bengt. Rulers of Sweden. Historiska Media, 2004.
 Lagerqvist Lars O., Åberg Nils. Kings and Rulers of Sweden. Vincent Publications, 2002.

Monarchs
Sweden
Monarchs
 List of Swedish monarchs